The Socialist Mexican Party (PMS) was a left-wing Mexican political party, and one of the immediate antecedents of the present Party of the Democratic Revolution. It was the last effort to unify the different Mexican left-wing parties, as well as the last political party in the country to officially use the word "socialist" in its name. It existed between 1987 and 1989.

The PMS was founded in 1987 through the merger of the Unified Socialist Party of Mexico, the Mexican Workers' Party, the Communist Leftist Union, the People's Revolutionary Movement and the Revolutionary Patriotic Party.

The party participated solely in the 1988 elections, in which it had postulated Heberto Castillo as its candidate. A month before the elections, Castillo decided to decline his candidacy in favor of Cuauhtémoc Cárdenas Solórzano and integrate himself in the National Democratic Front that postulated Cárdenas to the Presidency of the Republic. In 1989, after the electoral process had finished, the PMS integrated with the old Democratic Current of the PRI and constituted the Party of the Democratic Revolution, with the own legal registry of the PMS.

PMS candidates for the Presidency
 1988: Heberto Castillo (declined)
 1994: Cuauhtémoc Cárdenas Solórzano (allied with PPS, PARM and PFCRN to form National Democratic Front)

See also
Unified Socialist Party of Mexico
Party of the Democratic Revolution
List of political parties in Mexico

References

Political parties established in 1987
Political parties disestablished in 1989
Defunct political parties in Mexico
Socialist parties in Mexico
1987 establishments in Mexico
1989 disestablishments in Mexico